The Firestone Indy 225 was an IndyCar racing event held at Nazareth Speedway from 1987–2004. From 1987–2001, the event was sanctioned by CART. In 2002, the race switched to the Indy Racing League. From 1987–1996, the race was scheduled for 200 laps. In 1997, the race was lengthened to 225 laps. Rising speeds had led to the races being completed very quickly, and CART officials worried that the fans were not getting their money's worth. The race was discontinued after the track closed permanently in 2004.

Nazareth also hosted the Marlboro Challenge all-star event in 1990 and 1992. IndyCar points racing would not return in Pennsylvania until their return to Pocono Raceway in 2013 for the first time since 1989.

Past winners

1982: Race shortened due to rain.
2000: Originally scheduled for April 9; postponed due to snow.

Lights and Atlantics winners

2000: Originally scheduled for April 9, postponed due to snow. Indy Lights and Atlantic races were not made up.

References

External links
Nazareth results at ChampCarStats.com

Former IndyCar Series races
Champ Car races
Motorsport in Pennsylvania
Northampton County, Pennsylvania
Recurring sporting events established in 1968
Recurring events disestablished in 2004